Donegal Bay (Bá Dhún na nGall in Irish) is an inlet (or bay) in the northwest of Ireland. Three counties – Donegal to the north and west, Leitrim and Sligo to the south – have shorelines on the bay, which is bounded on the west by the Atlantic Ocean. The town of Donegal and the River Eske lie at the head of the bay.

Donegal Bay is Ireland's largest bay, and also contains Ulster's highest (and Ireland's's second-highest) sea cliffs at Slieve League, which tower 1972 ft (601 m) above sea level.

Donegal Bay's beaches have some of Europe's finest surfing, caused by a combination by a direct west-facing location and the funnel-shape of Donegal Bay (the westerlies of the Atlantic Ocean get funnelled into a relatively small area, which increases the size of the swell). Rossnowlagh and Bundoran are recognised by the European surfing community as among Ireland's finest surf beaches with good facilities and excellent water quality.

Towns on the Bay 

 Ballyshannon
 Bundoran
 Coolmore
 Donegal
 Killybegs
 Mountcharles
 Mullaghmore
 Rossnowlagh
 Tullaghan

Rivers that empty into the bay 
 River Drowes (between Bundoran and Tullaghan)
 River Erne (at Ballyshannon)
 River Eske (at Donegal Town)

Islands in the bay 
 Isle of St Ernan
 Belle's Isle
 Rotten Island

Geographical coordinates 
 Latitude: 54° 40' N (54.67)
 Longitude: 9° 04' W (-9.07)
 NWS buoy: 62093 M4

References 
 Slieve League cliffs

External links 
 Donegal Bay Visitors site
 Donegal Bay Weather Buoy

Other projects

Bays of County Donegal
Bays of County Sligo
Landforms of County Leitrim